Hapeville is a city in Fulton County, Georgia, United States, that is 2.5 square miles wide. Hapeville is located inside I-285 between the city of Atlanta to its North and the Atlanta International Airport to its south. The population was 6,553 at the 2020 census, an increase of 180 residents from the 2010 census. Hapeville is named for Dr. Samuel Hape, one of the area's original landowners and its first mayor. Dr. Hape and other members of his family are buried in Atlanta's Oakland Cemetery.

History

During the 1950s and 1960s, Hapeville was a thriving part of the Tri-City (Hapeville, East Point, College Park) area and its post-World War II population supported four elementary schools (Josephine Wells, North Avenue, College Street, and St. John's Catholic school) and one high school.  During the 40 years following, it became regarded as a somewhat depressed industrial area.  Since 2005, Hapeville has seen significant gentrification, beginning with the Virginia Park neighborhood and then spreading throughout the city. Hapeville has been discovered by young professionals seeking historic neighborhoods close to downtown Atlanta, and there has been a great deal of new residential construction, including single-family homes, townhomes, and upscale apartments.  This new residential development has led to a revived historic downtown.  Hapeville has also been discovered by metro Atlanta's arts community, and the beginnings of an artist colony have taken shape with the formation of the Hapeville Arts Alliance. The Hapeville Historic District is listed on the National Register of Historic Places.

From 1947 until 2006, Hapeville was home to the Ford Atlanta Assembly Plant, recently manufacturing the Taurus. There are development plans to open a multi-use development, Aerotropolis Atlanta, on the site, which is adjacent to Atlanta Airport. Currently, Porsche North America is building its North America Headquarters on the Ford site.

Hapeville is also home to the Dwarf House - the first Chick-fil-A restaurant which was totally rebuilt and greatly expanded in 2021, the original location's 4th incarnation. Hapeville is also home to the first Johnny's Pizza.  Today, Hapeville is also home to portions of the Porsche North American Headquarters. While their HQ building is technically in Atlanta, their new Porsche Classic Cars Restoration Facility, Porsche Automotive Service Center, and the Porsche Experience track expansion are all in Hapeville.

Geography

Demographics

2020 census

As of the 2020 United States census, there were 6,553 people, 2,780 households, and 1,078 families residing in the city.

2010 census
As of 2010, Hapeville had a population of 6,373.  The racial and ethnic composition of the population was 42.8% White, 28.8% Black or African American, 1.1% Asian Indian, 4.6% other Asian, 0.6% Native American, 18.8% from some other race (0.2% non-Hispanic from some other race) and 3.3% from two or more races.  35.1% of the population was Hispanic or Latino of any race.

2000 census
At the 2000 census there were 2,375 households, 26.4% had children under the age of 18 living with them, 35.2% were married couples living together, 15.1% had a female householder with no husband present, and 41.3% were non-families. 32.1% of households were one person and 9.3% were one person aged 65 or older.  The average household size was 2.60 and the average family size was 3.29.

The age distribution was 24.4% under the age of 18, 11.2% from 18 to 24, 33.4% from 25 to 44, 20.1% from 45 to 64, and 10.8% 65 or older.  The median age was 33 years. For every 100 females, there were 108.3 males.  For every 100 females age 18 and over, there were 111.4 males.

The median household income was $34,158 and the median family income  was $37,647. Males had a median income of $25,127 versus $23,766 for females. The per capita income for the city was $15,793.  About 13.7% of families and 17.9% of the population were below the poverty line, including 20.1% of those under age 18 and 11.7% of those age 65 or over.

Economy
Korean Air Cargo's U.S. headquarters are in Hapeville, near the northeast corner of the Hartsfield-Jackson Atlanta International Airport. It is also home to Porsche's US headquarters. Delta Air Lines has its headquarters in Atlanta, near Hapeville.

Arches Brewing is also located in Hapeville, serving as Hapeville's first brewery with a focus on Old World Beers.

Education
Hapeville is a part of Fulton County Schools. Residents are zoned to Hapeville Elementary School, Paul D. West Middle School in East Point, and Tri-Cities High School in East Point. In addition, Hapeville Charter Middle School is located in Hapeville.

Private schools include St. John the Evangelist Catholic School of the Roman Catholic Archdiocese of Atlanta.

The Atlanta-Fulton Public Library System operates the Hapeville Branch.

Notable people
 Comedian Jeff Foxworthy was raised in Hapeville and graduated from Hapeville High School.
 Educator and politician Hank Huckaby was raised in Hapeville.

Gallery

References

External links

 City of Hapeville official website
 Hapeville Living
 Hapeville Georgia historical marker

 
Cities in Fulton County, Georgia
Hapeville
Cities in Georgia (U.S. state)